Legat is a surname, and may refer to:

 Arthur Legat (1898–1960), Belgian racing driver
 Michael Legat (1923–2011), British writer
 Nadine Nicolaeva-Legat, Russian prima ballerina
 Nikolai Legat (1869–1937), Russian ballet dancer
 Sergei Legat (1875–1905), Russian ballet dancer 
 Thorsten Legat (born 1968), German footballer 

Old-Prussian-language surnames